The USARL Grand Final is the championship-deciding game of the USAs premier rugby league competition, the USARL. The first was held in 2011.

Finals

Winners

See also

NRL Grand Final
NRL Women's Grand Final
AMNRL

References

External links

USA Rugby League
Rugby league club matches
Grand finals